Mark B. Steffen (born August 30, 1962) is an American politician in the Kansas Senate from the 34th district. He assumed office in 2021, after beating one-term Republican incumbent Edward Berger with 57.5% of the vote in the August 4, 2020 primary, and Democrat Shanna Henry with 69.8% of the vote in the general election. Steffen is an anesthesiologist who has promoted medications deemed contraindicated for sufferers from COVID-19 by the United States Food and Drug Administration, including Ivermectin and Hydroxychloroquine. On January 26, 2022, he appeared before a Kansas Senate committee to tout these purported remedies. On January 26, 2022, he admitted that he had been under investigation by the Kansas board of Healing Arts for 18 months and contended that Dr. Steve Stites, the chief medical officer at The University of Kansas Health System, who has been critical of politicians who oppose vaccination and masking was "the Kansas Dr. Fauci," accusing him of spreading "propaganda." Steffen demanded that a "panel of physicians and scientists from both sides of this issue," be convened.

References

External links
Vote Smart Mark Steffen

Living people
1962 births
Republican Party Kansas state senators
21st-century American politicians
University of Oklahoma alumni
Northwestern Oklahoma State University alumni